Paludella squarrosa, the angled paludella moss, is a species of moss belonging to the family Meesiaceae.

It is native to the Northern Hemisphere.

References

Splachnales